A NACA score (or National Advisory Committee for Aeronautics score) is a scoring system of the severity in cases of medical emergencies such as injuries, diseases or poisonings. It was developed from the National Advisory Committee for Aeronautics for accidents in aviation.

The NACA score is divided into the following, specified with Roman numerals or the Arabic zero.

Categories:

References

External links 
 ÖGAN / Scoring systems in emergency medicine (in German)

Diagnostic emergency medicine
Medical scales
National Advisory Committee for Aeronautics